The El Paso Stanton Street Port of Entry, located at the Good Neighbor International Bridge is limited to processing passenger vehicles that are enrolled in the SENTRI program.  It is open from 6:00 AM - midnight weekdays, and 8:00 AM - midnight Saturdays and Sundays.

A bridge has existed at this location since approximately 1896, and US Customs services began soon afterward.  The bridge was rebuilt several times, periodically damaged by floods.  Since its reconstruction in 1967 as part of the Chamizal Treaty between the US and Mexico, the Good Neighbor International Bridge (known locally as the Stanton Street Bridge) was dedicated to southbound traffic.  In 1998, the U.S. Immigration and Naturalization Service and U.S. Customs Service chose this bridge as the best location to set up a dedicated commuter lane to relieve cross-border congestion in the busy El Paso-Ciudad Juarez metroplex.  The General Services Administration constructed a port of entry on available land just west of the bridge and it was opened to pre-enrolled northbound traffic in September 1999.

References

See also

 List of Mexico–United States border crossings
 List of Canada–United States border crossings

Mexico–United States border crossings
1999 establishments in Texas
Buildings and structures completed in 1999
Buildings and structures in El Paso, Texas